Nicholas Cole may refer to:

Nick Cole (born 1984), American football player
Nick Cole (racing driver) in Formula F100 
Sir Nicholas Cole, 1st Baronet (died 1660), English Royalist during the English Civil War
Sir Nicholas Cole, 3rd Baronet (1685–1711), of the Cole baronets

See also
Cole (name)
Nicholas Coles (disambiguation)